Giuseppe Prestipino Giarritta (born 23 August 1943), professionally known by his pseudonym Pino Presti, is an Italian   bassist, arranger, composer, conductor and record producer from Milan. He is a 5th-dan black belt in Shotokan Karate.

Presti was very young when he first entered the music business. He started as a bass guitar player, than gradually began as an arranger, composer, orchestra conductor, and producer. Among his collaborations in different genres of music like jazz, pop, funk, soul, and Latin music are Mina (the most famous Italian pop singer), Gerry Mulligan, Ástor Piazzolla (with whom he has performed on 24 recordings as a sideman, including the well known composition Libertango), Quincy Jones, Wilson Pickett, Shirley Bassey, Franco Cerri, Maynard Ferguson, Stéphane Grappelli, Severino Gazzelloni, Aldemaro Romero, and Tullio De Piscopo among others.

Early life
Son of an accomplished violinist, Arturo Prestipino Giarritta, Presti began studying piano and music theory at the age of 6. When he was 17, he started his career performing as vocalist and bass guitarist in clubs as well as working in recording studios as an instrumentalist.
Although he had a contract with Durium of Milano as a singer, he decided to concentrate only on performing music. He recorded hundreds of songs with major Italian artists such as Mina, Giorgio Gaber, Ornella Vanoni, Gino Paoli, Bruno Lauzi, Fabrizio De André, Sergio Endrigo, Mia Martini, Franco Battiato, Adriano Celentano, Milva, Pino Donaggio, Gigliola Cinquetti, Caterina Caselli, Bobby Solo, Fausto Leali, Michele, Ivan Graziani, Loredana Bertè and many others.

Music career

After backing Mina as a bass guitarist in studio and on tour for many years, Pino Presti arranged and conducted many of her songs.  He also backed her as a singer, as in "Flamingo" and other tracks. From 1971 up until her last public appearances at Bussoladomani in 1978, Presti arranged and conducted 86 of Mina's tracks, including the hits "Grande grande grande", "E penso a te", "L'importante è finire", "E poi", "Città vuota", "La pioggia di marzo", "Fiume azzurro", "Domenica sera" and others, and albums such as Mina, Cinquemilaquarantatre, Frutta e verdura, Amanti di valore, Baby Gate, La Mina, Singolare, Mina con bignè, Mina Live '78.

Presti composed four songs for Mina: "Tentiamo ancora", for the album Frutta e verdura (1973),  "L'amore è un'altra cosa", for Mina® (1974), "Amante amore", for Mina con bignè (1977), and "Bignè", for Ridi pagliaccio (1988).

On Mina's come-back at the Bussoladomani theatre in Viareggio on 24 June 1978, Nantas Salvataggio wrote an enthusiastic review of the event in the Il Giorno newspaper: « Mina was accompanied by an orchestra as that of a grand Las Vegas show.

The Italian press, as well as others, described the concert as a "triumph" and underlined the contribution of the backing orchestra (14 members and the chorus), directed by Presti.

Between the 1970s and 1980s, he collaborated on recordings and or concerts with prominent personalities of the international music scene such as Wilson Pickett, Shirley Bassey, Quincy Jones, Gerry Mulligan, Ástor Piazzolla, Maynard Ferguson, Severino Gazzelloni, Franco Cerri, Shirley Bunnie Foy, Stéphane Grappelli, Aldemaro Romero, Tullio De Piscopo, Gianni Bedori, Eartha Kitt, Brian Auger, Lara Saint Paul, Bruno De Filippi, George Aghedo, Augusto Martelli, Enrico Intra, Ellade Bandini, Angel Pocho Gatti, Caterina Valente, Bill Conti, Hugo Heredia, and Maurice Vander.

During the flight to Italy Wilson Pickett's bassist had been blocked at London airport and during the troublesome search for a substitute once he arrived in Sanremo, Pickett listened to me while I was playing with Brenton Wood; he blocked everyone and decided that I would be the bass player for him during the performance of the song "Un' Avventura", in competition at the Sanremo Music Festival. After the Festival, Wilson Pickett and the whole band also wanted me for the following European tour. – Pino Presti, during the Rai Tv show "Auditorio A" 

He is listed under his real name, Giuseppe Prestipino, on the record Libertango with Ástor Piazzolla and in Summit by Ástor Piazzolla and Gerry Mulligan. He is listed under the name Giuseppe "Pino" Prestipino Giarritta on the records La Onda Máxima and Onda Nueva Instrumental by the Venezuelan pianist, composer, arranger Aldemaro Romero.

In April 1975 during the European tour with Mulligan and Piazzolla, he also played at the Olympia Theatre in Paris and at the World Music Festival in Palma, Majorca. The combo was composed by Gerry Mulligan (saxophone baritone), Ástor Piazzolla (bandoneón), Tom Fay (piano), Pino Presti (electric bass), Tullio De Piscopo (drums), Waldo de los Rios (organ), Sergio Farina (electric guitar). One set was for Gerry Mulligan, the second was dedicated to Ástor Piazzolla and the last one was the reunion of Astor and Gerry and the songs of this last set were those that had been issued on the LP Summit-Reunion Cumbre.

In 1976 he created and produced for Atlantic Records the first dance-funk album in Italy: 1st round with hit songs such as Smile, Funky Bump, L'estate di Laura,  Sunny.

In 1977 he signed a contract with RAI2 as arranger, conductor and composer of original music for the noted TV show, Auditorio A, directed by Stefano De Stefani. On that occasion, he was the conductor of a big band composed of 56 musicians with star names like: Gino Paoli, Sergio Endrigo, Milva, Pino Daniele, Maynard Ferguson, Angelo Branduardi, Rino Gaetano, Fausto Leali, Giorgio Baiocco, Banco del Mutuo Soccorso.
Other top shows were : C'era due volte, directed by Enzo Trapani (1980) and Il cappello sulle ventitré, directed by Fernanda Turvani (1983).

Besides composing music for TV series since the 1980s, Pino Presti has been creating and producing albums under various pseudonyms for renowned labels such as Polydor, Baby Records, Barclay, Edizioni Curci, Durium, Dischi Ricordi, Joker, as well as independent ones: Emergency Records, Soul Xpression, Level One, Self.

He has been living in France since 2004 and in 2009 created and produced the album, A La Costa Sud with 28 vocalists and / or instrumentalists who are from various continents and nations but who regularly perform in theaters and clubs in the French Riviera.

In 2011, he composed a five hours soundtrack comprising music of different genres for Grand Heritage Hotel Group (and for its related media).  These genres range from classic jazz, to nu jazz, bossanova, world music, and ambient music.

In 2013 Presti co-produced the tribute album Shirley Bunnie Foy, consisting of seventeen tracks performed by jazz vocalist Shirley Bunnie Foy in her 60 years career. The album includes such noted artists as The Dell-Tones, Tony Scott, Archie Shepp, Franco Cerri, Lou Bennett, among others.

In 2014 Presti composed, co-produced and released, under the pseudonym Mad of Jazz, the album Deep Colors, with the collaboration of keyboardists, synth programmers and composers Claudio and Andrea Calzolari.

In 2016 he has composed the music for the Advertising campaign 2016 of Scavolini, an Italian kitchen and bathroom products designer and manufacturer.

In 2019 he has composed the music for the book (+Audio cd) "Eco nel vento", by  Italian poetess Tania Cantone.

Martial arts 
Presti has trained in Shotokan karate and Goshindo under master Hiroshi Shirai from 1967 to 1985. He has also trained on several occasions under other Japanese masters such as Taiji Kase, Hidetaka Nishiyama, Keinosuke Enoeda, Takeshi Naito, Hideo Ochi. He holds a 5th degree black belt obtained in Rome, in 1987.

TV shows 

 1964 : Questo & Quello (Rai Uno) – Bassist, Singer (Hosted by Giorgio Gaber)
 1965/1966 : Le Nostre Serate (Rai Due) – Bassist, Singer (Hosted by Giorgio Gaber)
 1969 : Sanremo Festival (Rai Uno) – Bassist with Wilson Pickett
 1977 : Auditorio A (Rai Due) – Composer, arranger, Conductor (Guest appearance by Maynard Ferguson).
 1980 : C'era due volte (Rai Due) – Composer, arranger, Conductor (Guest appearances by Peter Tosh).
 1983 : l Cappello sulle ventitré (Rai Due) – Composer, arranger, Conductor (Hosted by Gino Paoli)

Discography (selected)

Albums
1st round  –  Atlantic Records (1976)   
Maja Andina –  Saar Records (1990)
A La Costa Sud –  Edizioni Curci (2009)
Café Ipanema 2011  – Rambling Records (2011)
Shirley Bunnie Foy – MAP Golden Jazz (2013)
Deep Colors – MAP/ Paper Moon (2014)

Singles

 "Rimani ancora/Oh! Jenny" – Durium (1964)
 "In un posto fuori dal mondo/Messaggio d'amore" – Belldisc (1969)
 "Karin/No sabe" – Dischi Ricordi (1970)
 "Smile/L'estate di Laura" – Atlantic Records (1975)
 "Funky Bump/C.so Buenos Ayres" – Atlantic Records (1976)
 "Shitân Disco Shitân" – Barclay (1977)
 "Sundown" – Durium (1978)
 "You Know The Way part I/You Know The Way part II" – Baby Records (1979)
 "You Know The Way" – Vinyl 12" 33 ⅓ RPM – Emergency Records (1980)
 "Money (That What I Want)" – Vinyl 12" 33 ⅓ RPM – Baby Records (1980)
 "To Miami/Mama's Away" – Cetra Records (1980)
 "Dancing Nights/And I Love Her" – Polydor Records (1983)
 "Ya No Puedo Vivir (The Bush Remixes)" – Vinyl 12" 33 ⅓ RPM – Blow Up Disco (1991)
 "Once Again Now" – Vinyl 12" 33 ⅓ RPM – Soul Xpression (1992)
 "Divine" – Vinyl 12" 33 ⅓ RPM – Level One (2001)
 "Feel Like a Woman" – CD Single – Self (2005)
 "Jazz Carnival" – CD Single – Map (2015)
 "Funky Bump" (Unreleased Original Extended Version)/"Funky Bump" (Original 7" Version) – Best Record Italy (2015)
 "Disco Shitân" (Long version) – Best Record Italy (2015)
 "You Know The Way" (Disco Version by Tee Scott) – Best Record Italy (2016)
 "To Africa / Soul Makossa" (EP) – Best Record Italy (2017)
 "Pino Presti Featuring Roxy Robinson: You know Why" (EP) – Best Record Italy (2018)

As performer, arranger, conductor on other artists' albums

Mina – Artist: Mina – PDU (1971)
Cinquemilaquarantatre – Artist: Mina – PDU (1972)
Altro – Artist: Mina – PDU (1972)
Del mio meglio n. 2 – Artist: Mina – PDU (1973)
Frutta e verdura – Artist: Mina- PDU (1973)
Amanti di valore – Artist: Mina – PDU (1973)
Mina – Artist: Mina – PDU (1974)
Baby Gate – Artist: Mina  – PDU (1974)
Aulehla & Zappa – Artist: Aulehla & Zappa – PDU (1974)
Del mio meglio n. 3  – Artist:  Mina – PDU (1975)
La Mina – Artist: Mina – PDU (1975)
Singolare – Artist: Mina – PDU (1976)
Del mio meglio n. 4 – Artist: Mina – PDU (1977)
Mina con Bignè – Artist: Mina – PDU (1977)
Minantologia – Artist: Mina – PDU (1977)
You Know Why – Artist:  Roxy Robinson – OUT (1977)
Di tanto in tanto – Artist: Mina – PDU (1978)
Mina Live '78 – Artist: Mina – PDU (1978)
In Due – Artist: Wess and Dori Ghezzi – Durium (1979)
Filipponio – Artist: Filipponio – Cetra Records (1980)
Del mio meglio n. 6 Live – Artist: Mina – PDU (1981)
Il Flauto d'oro – Artist: Severino Gazzelloni – PDU (1983)
All'arrembaggio – Artist: Filipponio – Spice7 (1984)
Del mio meglio n. 8 – Artist: Mina – PDU (1985)
Del mio meglio n. 9 – Artist: Mina – PDU (1987)
Oggi ti amo di più – Artist: Mina – PDU (1988)
Ridi pagliaccio – Artist: Mina – PDU (1988)
Mazzini canta Battisti – Artist: Mina – PDU (1994)
Mina Studio Collection – Artist: Mina – PDU (1998)
Mina Love Collection – Artist: Mina – PDU (2000)
Colección Latina – Artist: Mina – PDU (2001)
The Platinum Collection – Artist: Mina – PDU (2004)
Platinum Collection 2 – Artist: Mina – PDU (2006)
The Best of Platinum Collection – Artist: Mina – EMI Records (2007) 
Je suis Mina – Artist: Mina –  EMI Records (2011)
Yo soy Mina – Artist: Mina –  EMI Records (2011)
I am Mina – Artist: Mina –  EMI Records (2011)
The Collection 3.0 – Artist: Mina – Warner Music (2015)
Tutte le migliori – Artist: Mina – Clan/PDU (2017)
Paradiso (Lucio Battisti Songbook) – Artist: Mina – PDU (2018)

As performer

12 Bacchette per una chitarra – Artist: Franco Cerri – gta (1966)
Stereo Beat –  Artist: Angel Pocho Gatti – CAR .JB. CRJLP 00011 (1967)
Dedicato a mio padre – Artist: Mina – PDU (1967)
This Is My Life – Artist: Shirley Bassey – United Artists (1968)
Mina alla Bussola dal vivo – Artist: Mina – PDU (1968)
Love and more Love – Artist: Puccio Roelens – Vedette Records (1969)
L'orchestra di Augusto Martelli dal vivo – Artist: Augusto Martelli – PDU (1969)
Quando tu mi spiavi in cima a un batticuore – Artist: Mina – PDU (1970)
Del mio meglio – Artist: Mina – PDU (1971)
La Onda Máxima  – Artist: Aldemaro Romero – Antor (1972)
Black Sound From White People  – Artist: Augusto Martelli –  Fontana Records (1972)
Fratelli La Bionda s.r.l. – Artist: La Bionda – Dischi Ricordi (1972)
Metti una sera Cerri – Artist: Franco Cerri – Jazz Italiano-Music (1973)
Dal mio lontano – Artist: Renato Pareti – Ducale (1973)
The Real McCoy – Artist: Augusto Martelli – Aguamanda (1974)
Libertango – Artist: Ástor Piazzolla – Carosello (1974)
Summit – Artist: Gerry Mulligan, Ástor Piazzolla – erre-t-v (1974)
Gerry Mulligan meets Enrico Intra – Artist: Gerry Mulligan, Enrico Intra – Produttori Associati (1975)
Lumière / Suite Troileana – Artist: Ástor Piazzolla – Carosello (1976)
Onda Nueva Instrumental – Artist: Aldemaro Romero – Velvet Música (1976)
Silence and Other Sounds – Artist: Roxy Robinson – ONE (1977)
 Dissonanza-Consonanza – Artist: Enrico Intra – Musica Jazz (1999)
 Circle – Artist: Pérez Prado (re-edit) – Schema (2013)
 Escandalo – Artist: Pérez Prado – (re-edit) – Schema (2014)
 Love Child – Artist: Pérez Prado / Don Alfio – (re-edit) – Schema (2014)

As performer, arranger, conductor on other artists' singles

  "Grande grande grande" – Artist: Mina – PDU (1971)
  "Domenica sera" – Artist:  Mina – PDU (1973)
  "E poi" – Artist: Mina – PDU (1973)
  "Lamento d'amore" – Artist: Mina  – PDU (1973)
  "La scala buia" – Artist: Mina –  PDU (1974)
  "L'importante è finire" – Artist: Mina –  PDU (1975)
  "Nuda" – Artist: Mina –  PDU  (1976)
  "Città Vuota (It's a Lonely Town)" – Artist: Mina –  PDU (1978)
  "Dentro" – Artist: Beba Lončar  – CBS Records (1978)
  "Momento" – Artist: Wess & Dori Ghezzi –  Durium (1979)
  "Pazzo non-amore mio/L'Unica" – Artist: Filipponio –  Cetra Records (1979)
  "Regina del futuro/Noia" – Artist: Marisa Sacchetto – F1 Team (1981)
  "Quale appuntamento" – Artist: Eleonora Giorgi – Dischi Ricordi (1981)

As performer

 "Cara Fatina/Lettera a Pinocchio" – Artist: Tony Renis, arranger-conductor Quincy Jones – Philips Records (1964) 
 "Che vale per me/Eccomi" – Artist: Eartha Kitt – RCA (1968)
 "La vita/Without A Word" – Artist: Shirley Bassey – United Artists (1968)
 "Domani domani/Pronto sono io"  – Artist: Shirley Bassey – United Artists (1968)
 "Yes/To Give"  – Artist: Shirley Bassey – United Artists (1968)
 "E' giorno/If You Go Away" – Artist: Shirley Bassey – United Artists (1968)
 "Chi si vuole bene come noi/Epirops" – Artist: Shirley Bassey – United Artists (1968)
 "Com'è piccolo il mondo/Manchi solo tu" – Artist: Shirley Bassey – United Artists (1968)
 "Concerto d'autunno/You Are My Way Of Life" – Artist: Shirley Bassey – United Artists (1969)
 "Ora che sei qui/Something" – Artist: Shirley Bassey – United Artists (1970)
 "Non preoccuparti/Adesso ricomincerei" – Artist: Lara Saint Paul, arranger-conductor Quincy Jones – Polydor (1973)
 "Cara Fatina" (re-edit) -Tony Renis / Quincy Jones –  His Master's Voice (1983)

See also 

 List of music arrangers
 List of jazz musicians
 List of jazz bassists

References

Bibliography 
 Mina, storia di un Mito raccontato, by Nino Romano, Rusconi pub., 1986
 Autori Vari (a cura di Gino Castaldo), Dizionario della canzone italiana, Curcio pub., 1990
 Mina, Mito e Mistero, by Nino Romano, Sperling & Kupfer pub., 1996
 Mina, i mille volti di una voce, by Romy Padoano, Arnoldo Mondadori pub., 1998
 Divina Mina, by Dora Giannetti, Zelig pub., 1998
 The Jazz Discography, by Tom Lord, The Thomas Lord pub., 2009 (Musician list)
 The Gerry Mulligan Collection, by Craig Hanley, Barnes & Noble pub.
 Knight Library's Jazz Collection, by Douglas Room, UO Libraries pub., 2009
 1000 concerti che ci hanno cambiato la vita, by Ezio Guaitamacchi, Rizzoli pub., 2010
 Franco Califano. Non escludo il ritorno, by  Salvatore Coccoluto, Imprimatur pub. - Interview with Pino Presti  , 2014
 Astor Piazzolla, by María Susana Azzi, Editorial El Ateneo pub., 2018 
 La Storia dalla Disco Music, by Andrea Angeli Bufalini / Giovanni Savastano, Hoepli pub., 2019
 Mina, Una Voce Universale, by Luca Cerchiari, Mondadori, 2020
 Night fever: Les 100 hits qui ont fait le disco, by Belkacem Meziane, Le Mot et le reste pub., 2020
 Astor Piazzolla - Una vita per la musica, by Maria Susana Azzi, Sillabe pub., 2021

External links 

 
 Myspace page
 Youtube videos  
 A la Costa Sud
 AllMusic Pino Presti - Credits
 Pino Presti Discography at Discogs

Italian music arrangers
Italian male conductors (music)
Italian male composers
20th-century Italian composers
21st-century composers
Italian bass guitarists
Male bass guitarists
Italian jazz musicians
Italian pop musicians
Italian record producers
Italian bandleaders
Atlantic Records artists
Italian session musicians
20th-century Italian conductors (music)
21st-century Italian conductors (music)
Italian keyboardists
Italian multi-instrumentalists
Italian male karateka
Shotokan practitioners
Musicians from Milan
Italian emigrants to France
1943 births
Living people
Tango musicians
Funk musicians
Jazz bass guitarists
20th-century bass guitarists
21st-century bass guitarists
20th-century Italian male musicians
21st-century Italian male musicians
Male jazz musicians